The 2017 Virginia Cavaliers men's soccer team represented University of Virginia during the 2017 NCAA Division I men's soccer season.  The Cavaliers were led by head coach George Gelnovatch, in his twenty-second season.  They play home games at Klöckner Stadium.  This was the team's 77th season playing organized men's college soccer and their 64th playing in the Atlantic Coast Conference.

Roster

Updated 07/28/17

Coaching Staff

Source:

Schedule

Source:

|-
!colspan=6 style=""| Exhibition

|-
!colspan=6 style=""| Regular season

|-
!colspan=6 style=""| ACC Tournament

|-
!colspan=6 style=""| NCAA Tournament

Awards and honors

Rankings

MLS Draft 
The following members of the 2017 Virginia Cavaliers men's soccer team were selected in the 2018 MLS SuperDraft.

References

2017 Atlantic Coast Conference men's soccer season
2017
2017 in sports in Virginia
American men's college soccer teams 2017 season
Virginia Cavaliers